The Virginia Correctional Center for Women is a female-only state prison in Virginia, USA. It is a part of the Virginia Department of Corrections.

Opened in 1931, it is located on US 522 / SR 6 between Maidens and Goochland, in central Virginia. The Virginia Department of Transportation maintains the entrance road as State Route 329.

References

External links
 Virginia Correctional Center for Women

Prisons in Virginia
Women's prisons in the United States
Buildings and structures in Goochland County, Virginia
Women in Virginia
1931 establishments in Virginia